During the 2001–02 Italian football season, Brescia Calcio competed in the Serie A.

Season summary
Brescia Calcio finished the season in 13th position in the Serie A table. In other competitions, Brescia reached the semifinals of the Coppa Italia.

Luca Toni was the top scorer for Brescia with 13 goals in all competitions.

Squad

Competitions

Serie A

League table

Results by round

Matches

Coppa Italia

Semifinals

UEFA Intertoto Cup

Finals

Statistics

Players statistics

References 

Brescia
2001–02